John Ball Jr. (24 December 1861 – 2 December 1940) was an English amateur golfer of the late 19th and early 20th century.

Early life
Ball was born in Hoylake, Cheshire (now Merseyside). His father was the prosperous owner of the Royal Hotel, located near the Royal Liverpool Golf Club, in Hoylake. Ball grew up playing golf as a youth on the Royal Liverpool course, which was established in his early boyhood.

In 1878, at the age of 16, Ball finished fifth in The Open at Prestwick. His run of Amateur titles began in 1888 and stretched until 1912, when he was 51 years old. His best year was 1890, when he won both the Amateur and Open Championships. Bobby Jones, who won the Grand Slam in 1930, is the only other golfer in history to win those two tournaments in the same year.

Golf career

After winning The Amateur Championship in 1888, Ball became the first English-born player to win The Open Championship in 1890, and in the same year won his second Amateur, the first to win both titles in the same year. Ball subsequently won the 1892, 1894, 1899, 1907, 1910, and 1912 Amateurs, a record eight titles in all, in addition to two runner-up finishes. Ball also won four Irish Amateur titles. He retired with a 99–22 record (81.8%) at The Amateur Championship.  Ball was also runner-up in the 1892 Open Championship, finishing three strokes behind Harold Hilton.

Ball dominated amateur golf in Great Britain. He won all the important golf championships as well as the hearts and respect of his country. In the words of British golf historian Donald Steele, "No golfer ever came to be more of a legend in his own lifetime."

Although he gripped the club tightly in the palms of both hands, Ball's swing was the most graceful and stylish of his era. Bernard Darwin wrote, "I have derived greater aesthetic and emotional pleasure from watching John Ball than from any other spectacle in the game." Ball learned the game competing against Harold Hilton on the links at Hoylake. In 1878, at the age of 16, he competed in his first Open Championship and finished fourth at Prestwick.
Ball was famous for refusing to carry a niblick, which had the loft of a modern-day 8- or 9-iron. He scorned the use of that club, describing it as "another bloody spade," and admonished the Rules of Golf Committee of the Royal and Ancient for permitting such horrid-looking contraptions to be allowed in competition. In a bunker, Ball would simply lay open the blade of a mid-iron and float the ball toward the hole with a smooth swing. He disliked the introduction of the increasing number of shallow cross bunkers to many courses, often parkland courses, calling them in derisory terms, ' geranium beds'.

It was this stubbornness and dogged determination that made Ball such a lion in match play. Darwin once noted that Ball had "a strong vein of hostility and if he wanted a particular player's blood, he would fight his way through a tournament with the sole object of getting at him." Darwin added, "That was not a personal hostility, but rather a desire to measure himself against a foe really worthy of him."

Words from Ball are hard to find. He was a shy, modest man who went about his business promptly without wasted motion. In his book, Sixty Years of Golf, Robert Harris wrote that "John's soft, whispering voice, his stoicism, his pawky jibs at easy rules and innovations, his relentless criticism of moderns with their fuss, and his total outlook on the game, were the very essence of golf."

Death and legacy
Ball died in Holywell, Wales, on 2 December 1940. Ball served his country during the Second Boer War. He was inducted into the World Golf Hall of Fame in 1977, and in 2018 a blue plaque was installed at Royal Liverpool Golf Club to commemorate his achievements.

Tournament wins
Note: This list may be incomplete.

1888 The Amateur Championship, St. George's Challenge Cup
1889 St. George's Challenge Cup
1890 The Amateur Championship, St. George's Challenge Cup, The Open Championship
1891 St. George's Challenge Cup
1892 The Amateur Championship
1893 Irish Amateur Open Championship,
1894 The Amateur Championship, Irish Amateur Open Championship
1899 The Amateur Championship, Irish Amateur Open Championship,
1907 The Amateur Championship
1910 The Amateur Championship
1912 The Amateur Championship

Club competitions
Royal Liverpool Golf Club
1881 Autumn Dowie Silver Cup Medal, Autumn Kennard Gold Medal, St. Andrews Day Gold Cross
1882 Club Spring Gold Medal, Spring Connaught Challenge Star Medal, Autumn Dowie Silver Cup Medal, Autumn Kennard Gold Medal
1883 Club Spring Gold Medal, Summer Lubbock Gold Medal, Autumn Kennard Gold Medal, St. Andrews Day Gold Cross
1884 Spring Connaught Challenge Star Medal, Summer Lubbock Gold Medal, Autumn Dowie Silver Cup Medal
1885 Club Spring Gold Medal, Summer Lubbock Gold Medal, Autumn Dowie Silver Cup Medal, Autumn Kennard Gold Medal
1886 Summer Lubbock Gold Medal, Autumn Dowie Silver Cup Medal, Autumn Kennard Gold Medal, St. Andrews Day Gold Cross
1887 Club Spring Gold Medal, Spring Connaught Challenge Star Medal, Summer Lubbock Gold Medal, Autumn Dowie Silver Cup Medal, Autumn Kennard Gold Medal, St. Andrews Day Gold Cross, Spring Challenge Vase, Spring Muir Jug
1889 Club Spring Gold Medal, Spring Connaught Challenge Star Medal, Autumn Dowie Silver Cup Medal
1892 Club Spring Gold Medal, Spring Connaught Challenge Star Medal, Autumn Dowie Silver Cup Medal, Autumn Kennard Gold Medal, St. Andrews Day Gold Cross
1893 Summer Lubbock Gold Medal, St. Andrews Day Gold Cross, Silver Bowl

Leasowe Golf Club
1899 Harvie Prize, Captain's Prize

Sources:

Major championships

Professional wins (1)

Amateur wins (8)

Results timeline

Note: Ball only played in The Open Championship and The Amateur Championship.

LA = Low amateur
NYF = Tournament not yet founded
NT = No tournament
CUT = missed the half-way cut
WD = withdrew
"T" indicates a tie for a place
R256, R128, R64, R32, R16, QF, SF = Round in which player lost in match play

Team appearances
England–Scotland Amateur Match (representing England): 1902, 1903 (winners), 1904, 1905, 1906, 1907, 1908, 1909, 1910 (winners), 1911, 1912
Coronation Match (representing the Amateurs): 1911

References

Sources

Open Championship: www.opengolf.com
1885 Amateur: The Glasgow Herald, 24 April 1885, p. 8.
1886 Amateur: The Glasgow Herald, 24 September 1886, p. 5.
1889 Amateur: The Glasgow Herald, 10 May 1889, p. 10.
1891 Amateur: The Glasgow Herald, 8 May 1891, p. 10.
1893 Amateur: The Glasgow Herald, 11 May 1893, p. 12.
1896 Amateur: The Glasgow Herald, 22 May 1896, p. 10.
1897 Amateur: The Glasgow Herald, 28 April 1897, p. 10.
1898 Amateur: The Glasgow Herald, 27 May 1898, p. 11.
1902 Amateur: Golf, June 1902, p. 397.
1903 Amateur: Golf, July 1903, p. 10.
1904 Amateur: Golf, July 1904, p. 8.
1905 Amateur: Golf, June 1905, p. 340.
1906 Amateur: Golf, July 1906, p. 29.
1908 Amateur: The Glasgow Herald, 27 May 1908, p. 14.
1909 Amateur: The American Golfer, Jul, 1909, p. 11. 
1911 Amateur: The Glasgow Herald, 1 June 1911, p. 10.
1913 Amateur: The American Golfer, July 1913, p. 222. 
1914 Amateur: Golf Illustrated, July 1914, p. 27.
1921 Amateur: The American Golfer, 4 June 1921, p. 24.
1927 Amateur: The American Golfer, July 1927, p. 66.

External links

English male golfers
Amateur golfers
Winners of men's major golf championships
World Golf Hall of Fame inductees
British military personnel of the Second Boer War
People from Hoylake
19th-century English people
19th-century sportsmen
1861 births
1940 deaths